is a railway station located in the southern part of Itō, Shizuoka Prefecture, Japan operated by the private railroad company Izukyū Corporation.

Lines
Futo Station is served by the Izu Kyūkō Line, and is located 11.5 kilometers from the starting point of the line at Itō Station and 28.4 kilometers from Atami Station.

Station layout
The station has two opposed ground-level side platforms connected by a level crossing. The station is staffed.

Platforms

Adjacent stations

History 
Futo Station was opened on December 10, 1961.

Station layout
Futo Station has two ground-level side platforms connected by a level crossing.

Passenger statistics
In fiscal 2017, the station was used by an average of 190 passengers daily (boarding passengers only).

Surrounding area
 Futo Elementary School

See also
 List of Railway Stations in Japan

References

External links

 Official home page

Railway stations in Japan opened in 1961
Railway stations in Shizuoka Prefecture
Izu Kyūkō Line
Itō, Shizuoka